Maurice Bernier (born 11 March 1947) was a member of the House of Commons of Canada from 1993 to 1997. His career has been in government and administration.

Born in Lac-Mégantic, Quebec, Bernier was elected in the Mégantic—Compton—Stanstead electoral district under the Bloc Québécois party in the 1993 federal election, thus he served in the 35th Canadian Parliament.

He left Canadian politics after losing to Liberal David Price at the restructured Compton—Stanstead riding in the 1997 federal election.

References
 

1947 births
Living people
Bloc Québécois MPs
Members of the House of Commons of Canada from Quebec
People from Lac-Mégantic, Quebec